Zsolt Durkó (10 April 1934 – 2 April 1997) was a Hungarian composer. He studied at the Budapest Academy of Music from 1955 to 1960 as a student of Ferenc Farkas, where he later taught. He earned the Distinguished Composition of the Year in 1975 at the UNESCO International Rostrum of Composers in Paris.

References
Zsolt Durko

1934 births
1997 deaths
Hungarian composers
Hungarian male composers
20th-century composers
International Rostrum of Composers prize-winners
20th-century Hungarian male musicians